Euroboy may refer to

Euroboy, the stage name of Knut Schreiner, Norwegian singer, musician and producer, member of various bands Kåre and The Cavemen / Euroboys, Turbonegro, Mirror Lakes and others
Euroboys, Norwegian band
"Euroboy" (song), a song by the Pet Shop Boys
Euroboy (magazine), a former gay pornographic magazine published by Millivres Prowler Group (MPG)